Miguel Thomàs de Taxaquet (also Miguel Tomás de Taxaquet) (1529 – 9 July 1578) was a Roman Catholic prelate who served as Bishop of Lérida (1577–1578).

Biography
Miguel Thomàs de Taxaquet was born in Lluchmayor, Spain in 1529.
On 8 Nov 1577, he was appointed during the papacy of Pope Gregory XIII as Bishop of Lérida. On 24 Nov 1577, he was consecrated bishop by Giulio Antonio Santorio, Cardinal-Priest of San Bartolomeo all'Isola, with Thomas Goldwell, Bishop of Saint Asaph, and Gaspare Viviani, Bishop of Hierapetra et Sitia, serving as co-consecrators. 
He served as Bishop of Lérida until his death on 9 Jul 1578.

References

External links and additional sources
 (for Chronology of Bishops) 
 (for Chronology of Bishops) 

16th-century Roman Catholic bishops in Spain
Bishops appointed by Pope Gregory XIII
Bishops of Lleida
1529 births
1578 deaths